Southwind may refer to:

 Southwind Drum and Bugle Corps
 Southwind Rail Travel Limited
 USCGC Southwind (WAGB-280)
 Southwind, a Filipino alternative band origin from Davao
 Southwind, an American band from Los Angeles in the late 1960s
 Southwind Vineyard & Winery, a winery in New Jersey

See also
 South wind